Juan Martín Fumeaux (born 13 March 2002) is a Uruguayan tennis player.

Fumeaux has a career high ATP doubles ranking of 1171 achieved on 11 November 2019.

Fumeaux made his ATP main draw debut at the 2020 ATP Cup, losing a doubles match to Pablo Carreño Busta and Feliciano López.

References

External links

2002 births
Living people
Uruguayan male tennis players
Sportspeople from Paysandú
Tennis players from Buenos Aires